Slam Book may refer to:
 Slam Book (film), a 2015 Marathi language drama film
 Slam Book (novel), a novel by Ann M. Martin